Haldimand—Norfolk is a federal electoral district in Ontario, Canada, that has been represented in the House of Commons of Canada from 1979 to 1997, and since 2004. The current Member of Parliament (MP) is Conservative Leslyn Lewis.

Geography
This riding is located in rural Southern Ontario, and comprises Haldimand and Norfolk Counties, except for parts of the Six Nations and New Credit Indian reserves. The total area is 3,073 km2. There are 205 polling divisions. Neighbouring districts include Ancaster—Dundas—Flamborough—Westdale, Brant, Elgin—Middlesex—London, Niagara West—Glanbrook, Oxford, and Welland.

Demographics
According to the Canada 2011 Census; 2013 representation

Ethnic groups: 95.0% White, 3.2% Aboriginal 
Languages: 89.5% English, 3.5% German, 1.4% Dutch, 1.2% French
Religions: 73.6% Christian (22.8% Catholic, 13.6% United Church, 8.6% Anglican, 6.1% Baptist, 3.6% Presbyterian, 1.9% Lutheran, 1.5% Pentecostal, 15.4% Other), 25.6% No religion 
Median income (2010): $29,580 
Average income (2010): $36,839

History
Haldimand—Norfolk has existed as a federal electoral district twice. It was first created in 1976 from the riding of Norfolk—Haldimand. Haldimand—Norfolk was later abolished in 1996, and was mostly replaced by Haldimand—Norfolk—Brant. It was recreated in 2003 from 12.0% of Erie—Lincoln and 88.0% of Haldimand—Norfolk—Brant.

From its first election in 1979 to 1988, Haldimand—Norfolk was represented by the Progressive Conservative Bud Bradley. In 1988, Liberal Bob Speller defeated Bradley. Speller went on to serve as Minister of Agriculture. In 2004, Haldimand—Norfolk elected Conservative candidate Diane Finley, who was re-elected in 2008 and 2011. After being re-elected in the 2006 election, Finley was appointed to the cabinet as Minister of Human Resources and Skills Development.  She was shuffled from the Human Resources and Skills Development Canada to the Citizenship and Immigration Canada portfolio on January 4, 2007.  After her 2008 election victory she resumed her former post as Minister of Human Resources and Skills Development in the Conservative minority government, a post she continued to hold until 2013.

This riding was left unchanged after the 2012 electoral redistribution.

Members of Parliament

This riding has elected the following Members of Parliament:

Election results

2003–present

Poll-by-poll results

Change from 2000 is based on redistributed results. Conservative Party change is based on the combination of Canadian Alliance and Progressive Conservative Party totals.

From 1996 until 2003, Haldimand—Norfolk did not exist as a federal riding, and was mostly represented by Haldimand—Norfolk—Brant. Results for 1997 and 2000 can be found on that page.

1976–1996

See also
 List of Canadian federal electoral districts
 Past Canadian electoral districts

References

Notes

External links
Federal riding history from the Library of Parliament:
 (1976 - 1996)
(2003 - 2008)
2011 Results from Elections Canada
 Website of the Parliament of Canada
 Campaign expense data from Elections Canada

Ontario federal electoral districts
Haldimand County
Norfolk County, Ontario